Pieter Bout (between 1640 and 1658 – between 1689 and 1719) was a Flemish painter, draughtsman and etcher.  He is known mainly for his landscapes, city, coast and country views and architectural scenes painted in a style reminiscent of earlier Flemish masters such as Jan Brueghel the Elder.

Life

Even while Pieter Bout was well known in his time as demonstrated by his frequent collaborations with prominent Flemish painters and his substantial output, the details of his life are not very well established.  He was probably born in Brussels somewhere between 1640 and 1658.  It is not known with whom he studied. He became a master in the Brussels Guild of Saint Luke in 1671 but his earliest work is dated 1664 and therefore predates his enrolment in the Guild.  He got married on 30 November 1667 in Brussels.

Although primary sources do not confirm this, it is believed that from c. 1675 to 1677 Bout worked in Paris where he frequently collaborated with Adriaen Frans Boudewyns, a Flemish painter residing in Paris at the time. Bout returned to Brussels in 1677, where he married a second time on 9 August 1695. He remained active in Brussels for the rest of his career although he probably visited the Dutch Republic and Italy.

The date of his death is uncertain with some placing it as early as 1689 and others as late as 1719 (based on the date of a painting the dating of which has given rise to some doubt).

Work

Pieter Bout was a very prolific artist who worked in many genres.  Most of his works include a landscape element and many are views of cities, villages, ports, beaches or rivers.  His views are in the tradition of Jan Brueghel the Elder.  They also show similarity to the work of David Teniers the Younger and the landscapes of Brussels landscape painters such as Adriaen Frans Boudewyns, Lucas Achtschellinck and Jacques d'Arthois, for whom he also often painted the staffage. He further painted Italianate landscapes in the manner of Nicolaes Berchem. Some of his work is also similar to that of Pieter Casteels II, a Flemish painter known for his Italianizing landscapes and city views. His paintings often include lively scenes such as village festivals and people having fun on the ice.

Pieter Bout collaborated on a beach view with Lucas Smout who painted the staffage.   This work referred to as Harbour and Fish Market (Musée des beaux-arts de Quimper) possibly represents a view of the beach and port of Scheveningen as in its composition and figures it closely resembles Pieter Bout's Selling Fish at the Beach of Scheveningen (Van Ham Auctions, 11 May 2012, Lot 518).

The Rijksmuseum attributes to Bout a religious painting entitled The Adoration of the Shepherds.
His paintings are lively and the brushwork is precise. His palette is clear and soft and announces the 18th century.

Bout's drawings and etchings are similar to his paintings in style and subject matter.

References

External links

Flemish Baroque painters
Flemish landscape painters
Flemish history painters
Flemish marine artists
Flemish genre painters
Artists from Brussels
1658 births
Year of death unknown